Mikhail Nikolayevich Promtov (June 12, 1857 - 1950 or 1951) lieutenant general, artilleryman, one of the centenarians of the Imperial Russian Army, a participant in the Russo-Turkish War (1877-1878), the Russo-Japanese War, commander of the World War I and participant in the White Movement in southern Russia. Emigrant.

Biography

Education, military service and the Russo-Turkish War (1877-1878)
Orthodox. The son of artillery major general Nikolai Dmitrievich Promtov. Educated at the Petrovsky Poltava military gymnasium. He entered the service on August 9, 1874. In May 1877 he graduated from the Mikhailovsky Artillery School and was released as second lieutenant to the 13th Artillery Brigade, in which he took part in the Russo-Turkish War (1877-1878). In December 1878, for military service, he was promoted to lieutenant. After the war, he served as senior adjutant of the command of the chief of artillery of the 7th Army Corps (1881-1898). In 1883 he was promoted to headquarters captain, in 1892 - to captains, and in 1899 to lieutenant colonels (with seniority on 04/01/1899). Successfully graduated from the course of the Officer Artillery School. In 1899 he was appointed commander of the 6th battery of the 26th artillery brigade.

Member of the Russo-Japanese War, commander of artillery units of the Russian army
Together with his battery, he entered the Russo-Japanese War at the beginning of 1904. For the valor shown in the battles near Liaoyang in the detachment of General P.K. Rennenkampf, he was awarded the Order of St. George of the 4th degree in August 1904 and promoted to colonel (1905). In June 1907 he was awarded the St. George Golden Arms. In 1907-1910 - commander of the 3rd division of the 30th artillery brigade. For the difference in combat training, he was promoted to major general in 1911 with the appointment of commander of the 32nd artillery brigade. Awarded for perfect service with the orders of St. Anne, 2nd art. (1898); St. Vladimir 4th art. (1902) with swords and a bow for courage in battles against the Japanese (1905); St. Vladimir 3rd art. with swords (1909); St. Stanislav 1st Art. (1912).

Warlord of World War I
He entered the war as commander of the 32nd artillery brigade. November 2, 1914 was appointed commander of the 82nd Infantry Division, which was part of the troops besieging the fortress of Przemysl. February 14, 1915 promoted to lieutenant general. During the general offensive of the Southwestern Front in 1916, he was a member of the 9th Army of General P. A. Lechitsky. In early June 1916 - commander of the Combined Corps of the 9th Army (82nd and 103rd Infantry Divisions). The Promtov corps, together with the 3rd cavalry corps of General Count F.A. Keller, was entrusted with the pursuit of the retreating southern group of the 7th Austro-Hungarian army. On June 10, 1916, the Promtov corps occupied Suceava, capturing 27 officers, 1235 lower ranks, and 27 machine guns. In April 1917, he commanded the 23rd Army Corps. Since September 1917 - commander of the 11th Army.

In December 1917, at the initiative of the Military Revolutionary Committee, with the participation of S. V. Petlyura, Promtov was removed from the post of army commander.

Member of the White Movement
At the end of 1918 he entered the service of the General A.I. Denikin Volunteer Army. In the autumn of 1919, he commanded the 2nd Army Corps of the All-Union Federal League of Justice. After successful battles with the Petliurists during the general retreat, the SSYUR made a withdrawal from the Fastov - Bila Tserkva area to the Znamenka - Nikopol line. Instead of crossing the Dnieper in the rear of the 14th Soviet Army and going to the Crimea to join the corps, Ya. A. Slaschev received an order from General N. N. Schilling to defend Odessa, which he called the “fatal mistake” of General Schilling. Promtov, carrying out the order, led the 2nd Army Corps to the city already left by the white troops. In January 1920, moving away from Odessa, he joined the units of General N.E. Bredov and made a retreat to the area occupied by the Polish army. February 25-26, 1920 was interned with troops in Poland. In July 1920, together with the remaining officers, he was sent from the camp to the Crimea, where he was appointed to the command of the commander-in-chief of the Russian Army, General Pyotr Wrangel. Evacuated from Crimea with the army in November 1920.

Life in exile
After evacuation to Constantinople, he moved to Yugoslavia, where he was hired by the Ministry of War. Since December 11, 1924 - Director of the Russian Crimean Cadet Corps. He remained in this position until 1929, when the corps was merged with the Russian Cadet Corps in Sarajevo into the First Russian of Grand Prince Konstantin Konstantinovich, the cadet corps, whose director was appointed General B. V. Adamovich. Since November 5, 1930 - the head of the military courses of the EMRO in Yugoslavia. His article “On the History of the Breda Campaign” (Sentinel. 1933. No. 107) provoked sharp controversy among the expatriate community.

He died in Belgrade in 1950 or 1951 in old age. He was buried in the New Cemetery.

Awards
Order of St. Stanislav 2nd degree (1894)
Order of St. Anna, 2nd degree (1898)
Order of St. Vladimir 4th degree (1902)
swords and bow to the Order of St. Vladimir 4th degree (1905)
Golden weapon “For courage” (VP 3.11, 1906)
Order of St. George 4th degree (VP July 28, 1907)
Order of St. Vladimir 3rd degree (1909)
Order of St. Stanislav 1st degree (1912)
Order of St. Anna 1st degree with swords (VP January 13, 1915)
Order of St. Vladimir, 2nd degree with swords (VP January 28, 1915)
swords for the Order of St. Stanislav 1st degree (VP May 1, 1915)
Order of the White Eagle with swords (VP October 22, 1915)

References

External links
 
 Наиболее известные русские эмигранты в Белграде

Russian military personnel of the Russo-Japanese War
Russian military personnel of World War I
White movement people
Recipients of the Order of Saint Stanislaus (Russian), 3rd class
Recipients of the Order of Saint Stanislaus (Russian), 2nd class
Recipients of the Order of Saint Stanislaus (Russian), 1st class
Recipients of the Order of St. Vladimir, 4th class
Recipients of the Order of St. Anna, 3rd class
Recipients of the Order of St. Anna, 2nd class
1857 births
1950s deaths